Ray Kaunisto (born February 7, 1987) is an American former professional ice hockey forward. He last played with the Brampton Beast of the ECHL.

Playing career
He played hockey at Northern Michigan University from 2006 to 2010, along with his younger brother Kory Kaunisto. On March 31, 2010, he was signed as a free agent by the Los Angeles Kings to a two-year entry-level contract. After two seasons with Kings affiliate, the Manchester Monarchs, Kaunisto became an unrestricted free agent on June 20, 2012, when the Kings did not tender him a qualifying offer.

On August 21, 2013, Kaunisto signed with the AHL's St. John's IceCaps, an affiliate of the Winnipeg Jets. Kaunisto however spent the majority of the 2012–13 season, in the ECHL with lower tier affiliate, the Colorado Eagles.

On August 28, 2013, he signed as a free agent to a one-year ECHL contract with the Kalamazoo Wings.

During his second season with the Wings in 2014–15, and after appearing in 43 games, Kaunisto was traded to the Evansville IceMen on March 11, 2015. The following day he was moved onto the Florida Everblades to finish out the season.

In the 2015–16 season, Kaunisto was without a club. On February 6, 2016, he signed with the Brampton Beast to play a final professional game in the ECHL before announcing his retirement from professional hockey on February 8, 2016.

Career statistics

Awards and honours

References

External links

1987 births
Brampton Beast players
Cedar Rapids RoughRiders players
Colorado Eagles players
Florida Everblades players
Ice hockey players from Michigan
Kalamazoo Wings (ECHL) players
Lake Erie Monsters players
Living people
Manchester Monarchs (AHL) players
Northern Michigan Wildcats men's ice hockey players
St. John's IceCaps players
Syracuse Crunch players
Utica Comets players
Worcester Sharks players
American men's ice hockey forwards